Gresik United Football Club, commonly known as GUFC, is an Indonesian professional football club based in Gresik, East Java. They currently compete in Liga 2, after promotion from Liga 3. They are considered to be one of the relatively worst football clubs in the country, and have the nickname "kebo pelit" ("The stingy Buffalo" in Javanese) due to delays and breach of contract done by the club towards their players.

History

Galatama era
The club was founded as Petrokimia Putra Gresik, which was established on May 20, 1988. The club was funded by the fertilizer company, PT Petrokimia Gresik, which has been active in the Liga Indonesia Premier Division for more than 15 years. Petrokimia Putra competed in Galatama, which at the time was a professional football league in Indonesia. Many big clubs from Galatama that were once in the same class with Petrokimia Putra are now already defunct, such as Krama Yudha Tiga Berlian, Bandung Raya, Warna Agung, Pardedetex Medan, Assyabaab Surabaya, Perkesa 1978, BPD Jateng, Yanita Utama, Makassar Utama, and Indonesia Muda. The clubs which are still surviving until now are Arema, Barito Putera, and Semen Padang and some of them now have their names changed, Niac Mitra now is known as Mitra Kukar, Pelita Jaya changed their name so many times until their recent current name, Madura United. PKT Bontang became Bontang FC and Petrokimia Putra merged with Persegres United and became Gresik United.

When they first entered Galatama, Gresik already had Persegres Gresik playing in the same division. In fact, some of the first batch of Petrokimia Putra players were Persegres alumni. At that time, the enthusiasm of the people of Gresik was more inclined to Persegres than to Petrokimia Putra. Some of Petrokimia Putra's first batch of players who graduated from Persegres, including Sasono Handito, Ferril Raymond Hattu, Rubianto, Reno Latupeirissa, Karyanto, Abdul Muis, Masrukan, Lutfi, Hasan Maghrobi, Derry Krisyanto, and many others.

Premier Division era
When the first edition of Liga Indonesia Premier Division was held in 1994–95, Petrokimia Putra was given with title "Champion without trophy". Because, in the final at the Gelora Bung Karno Stadium, they lost to Persib Bandung with a score of 0–1. In fact, in that match, Petrokimia scored the first goal through Jacksen F. Tiago. However, the referee annulled for no apparent reason.

Petrokimia Putra became the champion of 2002 Liga Indonesia Premier Division after beating Persita Tangerang at the final by a score 2–1. This achievement broke the hegemony of big city clubs in the main row of national football. Usually the league champions are won by teams from big cities. Unfortunately, in the next season, Petrokimia was relegated to Liga Indonesia First Division. They qualified for the 2003 ASEAN Club Championship, which is the first edition of the Southeast Asia competition. This season they qualified to semi-final after defeating S.League club Singapore Armed Forces with a score of 3–2.

On 2 December 2005 as a merger between two clubs from Gresik, which were Petrokimia Putra and Persegres Gresik. So Gresik United was established to replace Petrokimia Putra and Persegres, who once made City of Gresik the champion of Ligina.

With their fanatical supporters, Ultras Gresik is famous for its noise when the club competes and creativity in its actions. Their identity was removed (2012 - 2019) with the addition of the identity Persegres in their first name (Persegres Gresik United) by the management who was said to be an investor at the time. in 2017, they played in 2017 Liga 1 and only managed to finish in the last position of the Liga 1 standings by only collecting 10 points from 34 games (2 wins and 4 draws). With that result, Gresik United were relegated to Liga 2.

In 2018 Liga 2, they again experienced the same thing, where they only finished in 10th place out of 12 teams in the East Region of Liga 2, so they were relegated two seasons in a row to Liga 3. Until the 2021 season, Gresik United are still in the lowest tier of Liga 3. and in the 2021 Liga 3 East Java zone, they finished in 3rd position out of 69 clubs and they qualified for the National Round.

Players

Naturalized players

Coaching staff

Honours
 Liga Indonesia Premier Division
 Champion: 2002

Continental record

AFC Competitions

AFF Competitions

References

External links 
 
 Gresik United  on Liga Indonesia

Gresik United
Sport in East Java
Football clubs in Indonesia
Football clubs in East Java
2005 establishments in Indonesia
Association football clubs established in 2005
Gresik Regency